Rock and Roll-Ra Hívlak! is a studio album by American recording artist Wanda Jackson and Hungarian band Dolly Roll. It was released in 1992 via Python Records and contained 19 tracks. It was fourteenth studio release by Dolly Roll and the thirty seventh studio release by Jackson.

Background, content and release
Hungarian rock group Dolly Roll had recorded a series of successful European records during the 1980s and early 1990s. In the 1950s and 1960s, Wanda Jackson became one of the first women to have success as both a country and rock artist, having a series of charting singles during this period. 

Jackson had first begun recording in Europe during the 1980s, following a revival in her music overseas. Her collaboration with Dolly Roll would be her third European studio release and her thirty seventh studio album overall. It would also mark Dolly Roll's fourteenth studio album.

Rock and Roll-Ra Hívlak! contained 19 tracks of material. Most of the recordings were cut in the Hungarian language. This included Hungarian versions of Jackson's former single releases: "Let's Have a Party" and "Right or Wrong". Also included were Hungarian covers of Connie Francis's "Stupid Cupid", LaVern Baker's "Tweedlee Dee" and Little Richard's "Rip It Up". The album was released in 1992 as both a cassette and a compact disc. It was issued exclusively for the Hungarian market.

Track listings

Compact disc version

Cassette version

Release history

References

1992 albums
Hungarian-language albums
Wanda Jackson albums